Oh, Gevorg (Armenian: Օ՜,Գևորգ) is a 1979 Soviet comedy film directed by Sargis Petrosyan, produced by Hayflim jointly with Mosfilm. The film is about a womanizer who gets entangled in a complicated love affair.

Cast 

 Frunzik Mkrtchyan
 Zhenya Avetisyan
 Evelina Shahiryan
 Marie Rose Abousefian
 Martin Avetisyan
 Henrik Alaverdyan

References

External links 
 Oh, Gevorg on YouTube

Soviet comedy films
Armenfilm films
Armenian comedy films
Soviet-era Armenian films